The Tar, Nicotine and Carbon monoxide ceilings (or TNCO ceilings) are the average upper limits on total aerosol residue, nicotine and carbon monoxide contents of a cigarette, as measured on a smoking machine and according to a given set of ISO standards. Because these refer to machine-generated yields rather than the average smoker's intake, these values have often been decried as misleading.

A growing number of countries are nevertheless using such values as upper yield limitations for the cigarettes marketed under their jurisdiction.

Africa

(All values in mg/cigarette and must be reported on packs.)

Most countries on the continent do not impose maximum values for either tar, nicotine or CO, but Burkina Faso, Benin, Cape Verde, Morocco nevertheless demand that yield values be reported on pack.

Americas

(All values in mg/cigarette and must be reported on packs.)

Whereas Ecuador prohibits the indication of TNCO yields, Canada, El Salvador, Jamaica, Mexico, Panama and Peru require these values to be indicated without mandating upper limits. Canada demands values measured both with ISO standards and Health Canada's Intensive Method, as well as the yields for formaldehyde, hydrogen cyanide and benzene.

Asia & Pacific

(All values in mg/cigarette and must be reported on packs (see exceptions below).)

Although many countries in the region do not impose formal ceilings, some still request that tar and nicotine yield values be indicated on the pack (India, Indonesia, Japan). In Brunei, Malaysia and Vietnam, on the other hand, measured values must only be reported to the government.

HARA<BE

Eastern Europe and former CIS

(All values in mg/cigarette and must be reported on packs.)

While Kosovo should soon enact regulation imposing ceilings, Bosnia-Herzegovina only requires tar and nicotine yields to be indicated, without imposing maximal values.

European Union/EFTA

(All values in mg/cigarette.)

Current regulations are based on European Union directive  . All yields must be indicated on the side of the pack with a minimum surface area of 10%, except for Belgium, Cyprus, Finland, Luxembourg, Malta (12%), Liechtenstein & Switzerland (15%) and Italy (20%).

The maximum levels have been previously limited to 15 mg tar (1992), then to 12 mg tar (01-1998), without maximum levels for nicotine and CO.

Middle East

(All values in mg/cigarette and must be reported on packs (see exceptions below.)

The Palestinian Authority and Yemen do not require tar and nicotine values to be indicated on the packs' side.

Notes and references

See also
 List of smoking bans

Tobacco control
Smoking